Kuldip Singh Gosal (born 30 June 1946) is an Indian-born Hong Kong and later Canadian former field hockey player who competed in the 1964 Summer Olympics and in the 1976 Summer Olympics. Gosal was a part of the Canada field hockey team which won the silver medal at the 1975 Pan American Games.

References

External links
 

1946 births
Living people
Field hockey players from Jalandhar
Indian emigrants to Hong Kong
Hong Kong people of Indian descent
Hong Kong people of Punjabi descent
Hong Kong male field hockey players
Canadian male field hockey players
Olympic field hockey players of Hong Kong
Olympic field hockey players of Canada
Field hockey players at the 1964 Summer Olympics
Field hockey players at the 1976 Summer Olympics
Pan American Games silver medalists for Canada
Asian Games competitors for Hong Kong
Field hockey players at the 1966 Asian Games
Hong Kong emigrants to Canada
Indian emigrants to Canada
Canadian sportspeople of Indian descent
Canadian people of Punjabi descent
Pan American Games medalists in field hockey
Field hockey players at the 1975 Pan American Games
Medalists at the 1975 Pan American Games